Luis Mariano Fernandez Pimentel (born 27 June 1972) is a Spanish investigative journalist, writer and researcher of the great enigmas and mysteries of the world. He has a degree in Journalism and Communication from UNUS, Universidad de Baja California, Mexico. He also holds a degree in Journalism from the Secretaría de Educación Pública (SEP) of Mexico and from the Centro Nacional de Evaluación para la Educación Superior (CENEVAL). He belongs to the International Federation of Journalists (IFJ), an entity officially recognized by the European Union and the ONU agencies, being the largest organization of journalist worldwide.  He has been director of the television program of research and interviews "Mis Enigmas Favoritos" (English: My Favorite Riddles) on Mijas Comunicación, Digital Costa del Sol Tv, Spain, weekly. This program was also aired on numerous Spanish and Latin-American television channels.

Career
Fernandez began his career in 1990 at "Radio Costa del Sol", where he was a presenter and editor. Later he moved to "Cadena SER", where he was a reporter in such programs as "Milenio 3", "Ser Curiosos", "Espacio en Blanco".  After that  he moved to Mijas Comunicacion. Here he served primarily as a presenter, hosting and directing "Mis Enigmas Favoritos" (1999–2014) in which he had the opportunity to interview J. J. Benitez, Fernando Jimenez del Oso, Robert Bauval, Antonio Piñero, among others.  He subsequently hosted and create many other programs, such as "Noches casi Secretas" (2002–2014).

He published the book "Tumbas sin Nombre" and "El Misterio de las Caras de Belmez" with Editorial Edaf. In september 2021 published his first historical research novel, "El Camino Infinito".  A story of love and magic at Camino de Santiago with Almuzara Libros.

Fernandez  has received an important Spanish award for journalism, for his tv show "Mis Enigmas Favoritos", as the Highest Rated Show at Spain's local TV (in 2008) from the "Organización de Asociaciones de Televisiones Locales de España".

In 2015, he relocated to Latin America, where he has remained for the past year working on his own programs transmitted online. He is the presenter, editor and director for shows like "Mis Enigmas Favoritos", "El Viajero del Alma"., "Conectando Almas".

He also collaborates writing articles at Enigmas magazine and Año Cero.

References

1972 births
Spanish journalists
TN (TV channel)
Living people